The Church of Our Lady and St Michael in Abergavenny, Monmouthshire, is a Roman Catholic parish church. A Grade II* listed building, it was built between 1858 and 1860 to a design by Benjamin Bucknall.

History and architecture
Abergavenny remained a Catholic stronghold in the years after the Reformation and its first Catholic church was built on Frogmore Street.  This was replaced as the town's main Catholic church by Our Lady and St Michael's in 1860.  The construction of the church was funded by a local solicitor, John Baker Gabb, and the architect was Benjamin Bucknall. Bucknall was engaged on the building of Woodchester Mansion, Gloucestershire, for another Catholic client, William Leigh, and, aged only 25, was seen as a coming man in Catholic architectural circles. Bucknall's intellectual and architectural influences were the work and ideas of Augustus Pugin – he converted to Catholicism in the year of Pugin's death – and the French Gothic Revival architect Eugène Viollet-le-Duc, with whom Bucknall was in regular correspondence.

The church is constructed in Decorated Gothic style, with an accompanying Tudor Gothic presbytery. Built of Old Red Sandstone, with Bath Stone dressings and slate roofs, the church comprises a nave, North and South aisles and a chancel. An intended "grand tower and spire" were never built.

Internal features
Simon Jenkins describes the church as "a bold composition of church and presbytery." The interior of the church is largely unchanged since its construction with all its original Victorian furniture and furnishings intact. The presbytery is similarly unspoilt.  The church also has "an exceptionally fine collection of medieval and later vestments".

Notes

References

External links
 

Roman Catholic churches in Wales
Abergavenny
Grade II* listed Roman Catholic churches in Wales
Abergavenny
Benedictine churches in the United Kingdom
Abergavenny